Criminal Passion is a 1994 American mystery erotic thriller film directed by Donna Deitch. It was released for streaming by its producer in 2021 with the title Angel of Desire.

Cast 
 Joan Severance - Melanie Hudson
 Anthony Denison - Nathan Leonard
 John Allen Nelson - Connor Ashcroft
 David Labiosa - Mike Verutti
 Wolfgang Bodison - Jordan Monroe
 Shannon Wilcox - Joanne Pinder
 Henry Darrow - Captain Ramoz

References

External links 

1994 films
1990s mystery thriller films
American mystery thriller films
1990s English-language films
Films directed by Donna Deitch
1990s American films